Proposition 52 is a California ballot proposition that passed on the November 8, 2016 ballot, regarding indefinitely extending an existing charge on hospitals to fund Medi-Cal health care services. The charge, called the "Hospital Quality Assurance Fee", has been collected since 2009 with temporary renewals and was scheduled to expire on January 1, 2018.

Arguments for the measure stated that the charge helps to secure more than $4 billion in federal matching funds annually. Additionally, the measure would help curtail the diversion of some of the funds to things other than Medi-Cal. Arguments against the measure stated that it lacks oversight and that there would still be no guarantee that funds would be spent on healthcare.

References

External links 
 Yes on Proposition 52
 No on 52

2016 California ballot propositions
United States state health legislation